This is a list of animated Internet series. This list does not include Japanese, Chinese, or Korean series, as it is much more common in these regions (see Lists of anime for Japanese series).

1990s

2000s

2010s

2020s

TBA 

 Animated web series
Internet series